2014 Your World Awards is the third annual award hosted by Telemundo, which awarded prizes to the beauty, sports, music, film and telenovela. It aired on August 21, 2014, at 8pm/7c. It was hosted by Gaby Espino and Aarón Díaz.

Winners and nominees

Novelas

Music

Variety

Special awards
Favorite of the Night - Kevin Ortiz

Performers

References 

Telemundo original programming
2014 music awards
2014 television awards
2014 awards in the United States
Premios Tu Mundo